Thomas Doughty (July 19, 1793 – July 22, 1856) was an American artist associated with the Hudson River School.<ref>[http://www.themagazineantiques.com/article/painters-of-the-hudson-river-school-1/ Antiques Magazine Painters of the Hudson River School]</ref>Encyclopedia Britannica

Biography
Born in Philadelphia, Thomas Doughty was the first American artist to work exclusively as a landscapist and was successful both for his skill and the fact that Americans were turning their interest to landscape. He was known for his quiet, often atmospheric landscapes of the rivers and mountains of Pennsylvania, New York, New England, and especially the Hudson River Valley. He taught himself how to paint while apprenticing for a leather manufacturer. In 1827 he was elected into the National Academy of Design as an Honorary Academician.

He worked mostly in Philadelphia, but also lived and worked in Boston and New York.

Gallery

See also
 List of Hudson River School artists

References

Further reading
 Goodyear, Frank, Jr. "Life and Art of Thomas Doughty." Master's thesis, University of Delaware, 1969.
 American Paintings and Sculpture: An Illustrated Catalogue. National Gallery of Art, Washington, 1970.
 Walker, John Alan. "Thomas Doughty: Chronology and Checklist." Fine Art Source Material Newsletter 1 (January 1971): 5, no. 41.
 Goodyear, Frank, Jr. Thomas Doughty 1793-1856: An American Pioneer in Landscape Painting. Pennsylvania Academy of the Fine Arts, Philadelphia; Philadelphia, 1973: 17, 26, no.28.
 Howat, John K. "The Thomas Doughty Exhibition." American Art Review'' 1 (January–February 1974):

External links
An exhibition catalog available as a full-text PDF from The Metropolitan Museum of Art Libraries

1793 births
1856 deaths
19th-century American painters
American male painters
Hudson River School painters
American landscape painters
Schuylkill River
Artists from Philadelphia
19th-century American male artists